Fallagate was a political scandal in Guernsey in 2007, over the desire by Deputies of the States of Deliberation to appear corruption free. The desire to appear corruption free cost the island's 40,000 tax payers £60 each, and the resulting scandal led to the resignation of Laurie Morgan, the then Chief Minister of Guernsey, and the Policy Council, a committee of the States.

Background

Tender for Princess Elizabeth Hospital extension

The States of Guernsey put out a tender to build an extension on the Princess Elizabeth Hospital in St. Andrew. Several firms put in tenders, including R. G. Falla Ltd, Guernseys largest builder, whose bid was the cheapest by £2.4million.

Stuart Falla
Stuart Falla took over his father's construction company, R. G. Falla Ltd, in the 1980s, and has been a shareholder since. In 2004 Falla was elected as one of the Deputies to the States of Deliberation for the parish of Castel, and became the minister for commerce and employment.

Conflict of interest
Due to an apparent conflict of interest between his position as a Deputy, and his part ownership of R. G. Falla, Stuart Falla chose not to attend a committee meeting to discuss which bid would get the contract to build the hospital extension. At the time the meeting of R. G. Falla was the preferred tender at £25million, costing £2.4million less than any other tender. R. G. Falla subsequently withdrew its tender for the contract.

References

External links
The Princess Elizabeth Hospital Clinical Block - Consideration of circumstances which led to the withdrawal of the preferred tender in August 2006

Politics of Guernsey
Political scandals